Janis Strenga (born 5 February 1986) is a Latvian bobsledder, brakeman who has competed since 2008.

Career
He won a gold medal in the four-man event at the FIBT World Championships 2016 in Igls, Austria (with pilot Oskars Melbārdis, Daumants Dreiškens and Arvis Vilkaste). It was the first ever World Championships gold medal in bobsled for Latvia.

He also won a bronze medal in the four-man event at FIBT World Championships 2015 in Winterberg, Germany as well as 2012 World Junior Championship title at both two-man and four-man events.

Strenga competed in 2014 Winter Olympics at Sochi and won a gold medal in the four-man event. He became the four-man European Champion in 2015 and finished 3rd in the four-man event in 2016 Bobsleigh European Championship. At the 2014–15 Bobsleigh World Cup season Strenga as Oscars Melisande brakeman has 8 from 8 podium finishes in four-man events, including five first places.

References

External links

1986 births
Latvian male bobsledders
Living people
People from Sigulda
Bobsledders at the 2014 Winter Olympics
Bobsledders at the 2018 Winter Olympics
Olympic bobsledders of Latvia
Olympic bronze medalists for Latvia
Medalists at the 2014 Winter Olympics
Medalists at the 2018 Winter Olympics
Olympic medalists in bobsleigh
Olympic gold medalists for Latvia